Skulduggery Pleasant: Dark Days is young adult and fantasy novel written by Irish playwright Derek Landy, published in April 2010. It is the fourth of the Skulduggery Pleasant series and sequel to Skulduggery Pleasant: The Faceless Ones.

The story follows the sorcerer and detective Valkyrie Cain as she attempts to track down the original head of her mentor Skulduggery Pleasant to rescue him from the world of the Faceless Ones, as a team of previously significant villains return and join forces to get their revenge upon the pair. The book would not see release in the US and Canada until 2018. HarperCollins Audio also publishes the unabridged CD sets of the books read by Rupert Degas.

Plot summary

Valkyrie, Tanith, Ghastly and Fletcher have been searching for Skulduggery's skull for the past eleven months. While doing so, Valkyrie has been learning Necromancy with Solomon Wreath. While in her room one morning, Remus Crux attempts to kill her. Just when Crux is about to kill her, Solomon arrives and he retreats. Later, Valkrie manages to track the skull thanks to a Vampire called Caelan, who has set up a meeting with the trader, Thames Chabon.

Meanwhile, an old prisoner, Dreylan Scarab, has been released from prison and forms the Revengers' Club with his son, Billy-Ray Sanguine. They recruit Springheeled Jack, Dusk, Remus Crux and Vaurien Scapegrace. However, Sanguine and Scarab realize Scapegrace is a fraud, so they kill him and revive him as a Zombie. He is given the job of recruiting more Zombies. However, the Zombies are not allowed to eat living flesh.

At the trade, it is revealed that Valkyrie has been given a fake skull. After capturing Chabon, he tells her that Davina Marr, the Irish Sanctuary's new detective, had bought the skull for triple the price. The four create a plan to steal the skull. However, it goes wrong and they are all arrested. After being interrogated by Marr, Valkyrie uses her Necromancy to defeat Marr. While Tanith and Ghastly keep the Cleavers distracted, and with Fletcher they steal the skull. They teleport to China Sorrows and the three teleport to Aranmore Farm. The portal to the Faceless Ones is opened and they manage to retrieve Skulduggery Pleasant. Valkyrie and Skulduggery visit the Temple since Skulduggery disapproves Valkyrie learning Necromancy. After telling Valkyrie of the Death Bringer, he tells Skulduggery that their Soul Catcher is stolen by Sanguine. Skulduggery and Valkyrie then visit Finbar Wrong, who takes them to another Sensitive, Cassandra Pharos. She shows them a vision of the future, in which a woman called Darquesse destroys the world. Darquesse also kills Valkyrie's parents, which greatly affects Valkyrie. Before they leave, Valkyrie is given a Dream Whisperer. Valkyrie heads home, and her parents tell her that Melissa is pregnant.

The Revengers’ Club infiltrates the Sanctuary with Vampires and steals the Desolation Engine, a dangerous bomb. Thurid Guild orders the gang to look for the members. Valkyrie and Skulduggery visit the Midnight Hotel, which is run by an old friend of Skulduggery, Anton Shudder. They believe that the club will steal a Remnant, spirits which can possess people. Sanguine checks in the hotel as a guest, but because of the hotel's rules, Skulduggery cannot arrest him. But Shudder finds out that Sanguine is here to steal a Remnant using the Soul Catcher. Sanguine tells the three that there is a Zombie Horde outside the hotel, and unless they allow him to take a Remnant, they will die. However, the Zombies had eaten living flesh, and are on a rampage to eat more humans. The four manage to defeat the Zombies, but still Sanguine manages to take a Remnant.

At the Hiberniain, Kenspeckle Grouse is kidnapped by the Revengers’ Club. They also manage to kidnap Tanith. The Remnant is freed and possesses Kenspeckle, who fixes the Desolation Engine, and makes a copy. The Remnant is then given Tanith, which the Remnant could possess. Skulduggery and Valkyrie visit another information broker, Myron Stray, who has had his career ruined when his True Name was revealed. The two find out that the club are operating at Serpine's castle. Skulduggery, Shudder, Ghastly, Fletcher and Valkyrie go to the castle and manage to rescue Kenspeckle and Tanith and retrieve one of the Desolation Engines, but the Revengers’ Club escape. China Sorrows then uses her Symbol Magic to force the Remnant out of Kenspeckle. The High Priest of the Temple orders Wreath to take the Soul Catcher with the Remnant still in it. Later on, China shoots Crux after she learns that he has told her secret that she killed Skulduggery's family. The shot kills Crux.

At the Hibernian, the gang, including Shudder and Guild, figure out that the Revengers’ Club had made a second Engine, and that they are planning to use it at The All Ireland-Championships, which is at Croke Park Stadium, to blow up the Stadium, killing 80,000 people live on air. They all teleport to the stadium, and they find the rest of the club. Dusk manages to bite Valkyrie, but lets go early as he tasted something strange in her blood. Because of this, he stops his revenge. Guild manages to get the second Desolation Engine from Scarab, but Scarab tells him that he will blow up the stadium. When Guild refuses, he tells him that unless he blows up the stadium, his family would be killed by Sanguine. Guild reluctantly accepts this, but before he drops the bomb, Fletcher teleports him to the sea, where the bomb is set off there, but the bomb was modified to spare Guild's life. Valkyrie takes a taxi to Guild's home. She and Sanguine have a fight, and Sanguine wins. But instead of killing her, he keeps her alive, telling her that keeping her alive would be more fun. Sanguine leaves and Valkyrie returns to Croke Park. She finds out that both Guild and Fletcher are both alive. They teleport to the Hibernian, where Valkyrie kisses him. It had been revealed in the book that Guild had ordered the assassination of Esryn Vanguard after he attempted to bring the war to a truce. Guild accepts responsibility for his actions, and allows himself to be taken to prison. After the incident, the Sanctuary arrests Scarab and Springheeled Jack.

Marr, who was jealous of Skulduggery, takes the first Desolation Engine. She tricks Valkyrie and Skulduggery by telling them that Guild wants them to escort him to his cell. She uses Myron Stray's True Name and forces him to pop his eardrums. Using the Engine, Myron is forced to blow up the Sanctuary, killing Myron, Pennant and many other sorcerers. Skulduggery manages to fly away with Valkyrie and Guild. At Valkyrie's home, Valkyrie is woken up by a dream. The dream was about the time when she fought Serpine at the Repository. She had looked at her name in the Book of Names, and saw all three of her names. She realizes her True Name; Darquesse.

Characters

Valkyrie Cain

Skulduggery Pleasant

Fletcher Renn
Fletcher Renn is the last teleporter and Valkyrie's boyfriend.

Dreylan Scarab
Dreylan Scarab, who is the father of Billy-Ray Sanguine, is a powerful sorcerer and assassin seeking revenge for being framed for the murder of an peacemonger Esryn Vanguar during the war with Mevolent, which lead to his spending 200 years in prison, to which he formed the Revengers' Club to get revenge on the Sanctuary and the one who framed him, Thurid Guild

The Revengers' Club
The Revengers' Club is a group of past villains in the series, led by Dreylan Scarab; while all having different objectives, their main goal is to destroy the Irish Sanctuary. They consist of Scarab, Billy-ray Sanguine, Dusk, Remus Crux, and the recently zombified Vaurien Scapegrace and his army.

Thurid Guild
Thurid Guild is the Grand Mage of the Irish Sanctuary and former Exigency Programme Leader of the War against Mevolent.

Davina Marr
Davina Marr is a cruel and destructive agent of the American Sanctuary hired by Thurid Guild to take the place of Remus Crux as Prime Detective.

Caelan
Callan is a vampire who assists Valkyrie in tracking down Skulduggery's original head, known as the "Murder Skull".

Reviews

Skulduggery Pleasant: Dark Days has opened to largely positive reviews by critics.
 Alys Tandle (AlysTheBookWork.com)
Landy has a talent for balancing his stories with just the right amount of light and dark, but as the title suggests, things are heading down the path of darkness. Dark Days indeed.

 Jessica Alben (Danville Public Library):
This series has always been a lot of fun. Pleasant’s dry humor is spot-on and unlike the Harry Potter series (which also famously involves a child who learns about the magical world and his place in it), this is a little more grim from the get-go.
 Joseph Melda (The Book Zone):
It contains all of the Derek Landy trademarks that we have come to love so much - great characters, both good and evil; tense action scenes that will have your heart beating so fast you will think it is about to explode; great dialogue laced with the scintillating banter that we have to come love so much; and, of course, many many moments of spine-tingling horror.
 Rhys Wolfgang (ThirstForFiction):
Dark Days moves towards a grittier, darker, perhaps more character driven story that will be enjoyed by teens and preteens alike. Derek Landy’s magical world continues to widen its boarders, and nearly every book seems to improve on the last.
 Leanne Hall (Readings.com):
This is smart, funny, contemporary fantasy that’s up there with the best, easily as good as the books of Cassandra Clare or Eoin Colfer.

References

External links

Skulduggery Pleasant UK, Australia and New Zealand Official Website
Skulduggery Pleasant US and Canada Official Website

2010 Irish novels
Irish fantasy novels
Skulduggery Pleasant books
HarperCollins books
2010 children's books